Henry Hermansen (13 April 1921 – 18 January 1997) was a Norwegian cross-country skier who competed in the 1950s. He won a bronze medal in the 4 × 10 km relay at the 1950 FIS Nordic World Ski Championships.

Cross-country skiing results

World Championships
 1 medal – (1 bronze)

References

External links
World Championship results 

1921 births
1997 deaths
Norwegian male cross-country skiers
Biathletes at the 1960 Winter Olympics
Biathlon World Championships medalists
FIS Nordic World Ski Championships medalists in cross-country skiing
Norwegian male biathletes